Alok Agarwal (born 25 August 1967) is an Indian social activist and political leader associated with the Aam Admi Party (AAP). The State Convener of Aam Admi Party Madhya Pradesh, Alok is also a member of National Executive Committee. In 1990, Alok joined the Narmada Bachao Andolan, and for the last three decades, has been a key activist in building up this social movement and struggle of tribals, farmers, environmentalists, and human rights workers against the construction of big dams being built across the Narmada river in Central India. and for securing the rights and improved rehabilitation for the millions of farmers and tribals displaced by these dams. Since January 2014, he is also a member of the Aam Aadmi Party of India and contested the Lok Sabha 2014 polls from Khandwa Parliamentary Constituency in Madhya Pradesh .

Early life and education 
Alok Agarwal was born on 25 August 1967. He is the son of a retired government veterinary doctor. Due to his father's transferable posting in the early days, Alok's schooling and upbringing was spread at many different places. In 1989, he received his Bachelor of Technology in Chemical Engineering from Indian Institute of Technology, Kanpur. Alok resides in Khandwa, Madhya Pradesh.

Social work

Narmada Bachao Andolan 
In 2012, in response to a 17-day Jal Satyagraha by Alok and his colleagues, the government kept the level of the Omkareshwar Dam to 189 meters

In September 2013, Alok's team of Narmada Bachao Andolan led another Jal Satyagraha in three districts of Madhya Pradesh – Khandwa, Dewas and Harda, to press their demands of maintaining the height of the Indirasagar to 260 meters. In April 2015, another Jal Satyagraha began in Khandwa district.

Alok Agarwaol has also been an activist against the privatization of water and electricity. In 2003, his Narmada Bachao Andolan team took a lead role in a statewide "Bijli Bachao-Azadi Bachao" movement organized by Jan Sangharsh Morcha (a federation of several social movements of Madhya Pradesh) against the privatization and rise of electricity tariffs. Similarly, the organizations working against the privatization of water have also been receiving active support from Alok. Considering the need for a common front to respond to the multiple kinds of problems faced by the farmers, tribals and workers of the region, Alok's team helped form the "Nimar - Malwa Kisan Mazdoor" organization.

Alok has also led water harvesting projects to ensure the availability of water in the tribal areas. Along with his co-workers Alok Agarwal spent a month in the rehabilitation and relief work after the Gujarat earthquake.

Political career 

In January 2014, Alok Agarwal joined the Aam Aadmi Party (AAP). In 2014 he contested Loksabha election from Khandwa Loksabha Constituency. During Loksabha elections he was the convener of Aam Aadmi Party Madhya Pradesh Campaign Committee. Presently, he is national spokesperson of Aam Aadmi Party and Convenor of Aam Aadmi Party, Madhya Pradesh.

On 15 July 2018 Arvind Kejriwal announced Alok Agarwal as Chief Minister face from Aam Aadmi Party for upcoming Vidhansabha Election.

He fought 2018 Madhya Pradesh from elections from Bhopal Dakshin Pashim vidhansabha.

References 

1967 births
Living people
Politicians from Lucknow
Adivasi activists
Aam Aadmi Party politicians
21st-century Indian politicians
Madhya Pradesh politicians
People from Khandwa
Activists from Madhya Pradesh